Mansur ibn Yazid ibn Mansur al-Himyari al-Ru'ayni was an eighth century official for the Abbasid Caliphate.

He was the son of Yazid ibn Mansur, a maternal uncle of the third Abbasid caliph al-Mahdi. In 779 he spent two months as governor of Egypt. Between 781/2 and 783 he was governor of the Yemen, and in 796 he briefly served as the governor of Khurasan.

Notes

References
 
 
 
 
 
 
 
 

8th-century Abbasid governors of Egypt
Abbasid governors of Khurasan
Abbasid governors of Yemen
8th-century Arabs